This is a list of fauna found in the U.S. state of Michigan, including those of wider distribution. See also List of threatened fauna of Michigan.

Invertebrates

Cnidaria
 Craspedacusta sowerbyi

Arthropods

Arachnids
European garden spider
Misumenops celer

Crustaceans
 Armadillidium vulgare (common pillbug)
 Cambarus diogenes (chimney crayfish)
 Cambarus robustus (big water crayfish)
 Creaserinus fodiens (digger crayfish)
 Faxonius immunis (calico crayfish)
 Faxonius propinquus (northern clearwater crayfish)
 Faxonius rusticus (rusty crayfish)
 Faxonius virilis (northern crayfish)
 Procambarus acutus acutus (white river crawfish)

Insects

Coleoptera
 Brychius hungerfordi
 Cicindela sexguttata
 Colorado potato beetle
 Desmocerus palliatus
 Harmonia axyridis
 Megacyllene robiniae
 Neandra brunnea
 Rhyssomatus lineaticollis

Diptera
Chironomus plumosus

Dictyoptera
Chinese mantis (introduced)

Hemiptera
 Adelphocoris lineolatus
 Green stink bug
 Large milkweed bug

Hymenoptera
Dolichovespula maculata
Polistes dominulus
Polistes exclamans
Polistes fuscatus
Polistes metricus
Vespa crabro
Vespula maculifrons

Lepidoptera

Odonata
Blue dasher
Erythemis simplicicollis
Green darner
Ischnura posita
Lestes vigilax
Sympetrum vicinum
Variable dancer

Orthoptera
Differential grasshopper
Gryllus pennsylvanicus
Barrens or spotted-winged grasshopper
Spur-throat grasshopper
Blue-legged locust
Hebard's green-legged locust
Hoosier locust
Atlantic-coast or long-horned grasshopper
Lake Huron locust
Secretive locust
Post-oak grasshopper
Ceuthophilus silvestris
Ceuthophilus uhleri
Woodland meadow katydid
Bog conehead
Neoconocephalus retusus
Eelicate meadow katydid
Pine katydid
Davis's shield-bearer
Melodious ground cricket
Tamarack tree cricket
Pine tree cricket

Entognatha
Willowsia nigromaculata

Molluscs

Planogyra asteriscus (eastern flat-whorl)
Giant floater (Pyganodon grandis)
Northern riffleshell (Epioblasma torulosa)
Quagga mussel (Dreissena rostriformis bugensis)
Zebra mussel (Dreissena polymorpha)

Vertebrates

Amphibians

Birds
Longer list at Michigan Breeding birds Atlas, Appendix 3

 
 American bittern (Botanus lentiginosus)
American black duck (Anas rubripes)
 American coot (Fulica americana)
 American crow (Corvus brachyrhynchos)
 American goldfinch (Carduelis tristis)
 American kestrel (Falco sparverius)
 American white pelican (Pelecanus erythrorhynchos)
 Bald eagle (Haliaeetus leucocephalus)
 Baltimore oriole (Icterus galbula)
 Barn owl (Tyto alba)
 Belted kingfisher (Megaceryle alcyon)
 Black tern (Chlidonias niger)
 Black-backed woodpecker (Picoides arcticus)
 Black-capped chickadee (Poecile atricapillus)
 Snow goose (Chen caerulescens)
 Bobolink (Dolichonyx oryzivorus)
 Bobwhite quail (Colinus virginianus)
 Boreal chickadee (Poecile hudsonicus)
 Brant goose (Branta bernicla)
 Bonaparte's gull (Larus philadelphia)
 Broad-winged hawk (Buteo platypterus)
 Brown-headed cowbird (Molothrus ater)
 Canada goose (Branta canadensis)
 Canvasback (Aythya valisineria)
 Cardinal (Cardinalis cardinalis)
 Caspian tern (Sterna caspia)
 Common loon (Gavia immer)
 Common nighthawk (Chordeiles minor)
 Common raven (Corvis corax)
 Common tern (Sterna hirundo)
 Double-crested cormorant (Phalacrocorax auritus)
 Dovekie (Alle alle) 
 Downy woodpecker (Dryobates pubescens)
 Eastern meadowlark (Sturnella magna)
 Forster's tern (Sterna forsteri)
 Gray catbird (Dumetella carolinensis)
 Great blue heron (Ardea herodias)
 Great egret (Ardea alba)
 Great horned owl (Bubo virginianus)
 Greater yellowlegs (Tringa flavipes)
 Green heron (Butorides virescens)
 Hairy woodpecker 
 Henslow's sparrow (Ammodramus henslowii)
 Herring gull (Larus argentantus)
 House finch
 House sparrow
 King eider (Somateria spectabilis)
 King rail (Rallus elegans)
 Kirtland's warbler (Dendroica kirtlandii)
 Least bittern (Ixobrychus exilis)
 Lesser yellowlegs (Tringa melanoleuca)
 Loggerhead shrike (Lanius ludovicianus)
 Long-eared owl (Asio otis)
 Long-tailed duck (Clangula hyemalis)
 Mallard
 Merganser
 Merlin (Falco columbarius)
 Mourning dove (Zenaida macroura)
 Mute swan
 Northern flicker
 Northern gannet (Morus bassanus) (rare in state)
 Northern goshawk
 Northern harrier (Circus cyaneus)
 Northern mockingbird (Mimus polyglottos)
 Northern shoveler (Spatula clypeata)
 Osprey (Pandion haliaetus)
 Peregrine falcon (Falco peregrinus)
 Pheasant
 Pigeon
 Pileated woodpecker (Dryocuopus pileatus)
 Pintail duck (Anas acuta)
 Piping plover (Charadrius melodus)
 Prairie warbler (Dendroica discolor)
 Purple martin (Progne subis)
 Red crossbill (Loxia curvirostra)
 Redhead duck
 Red-shouldered hawk (Buteo lineatus)
 Red-tailed hawk
 Red-throated loon
 Red-winged blackbird
 Ring-billed gull (Larus delawarensis)
 Robin
 Ross's goose
 Ruby-throated hummingbird
 Ruffed grouse
 Rusty blackbird (Euphagus carolinus)
 Sandhill crane (Grus canadensis)
 Scarlet tanager (Piranga olivacea)
 Scaup
 Scoters
 Sharptailed grouse
 Short-eared owl (Asio flammeus)
 Snipe
 Snowy owl
 Sora rail
 Spruce grouse (Canachites canadensis)
 Trumpeter swan (Cygnus buccinator)
 Tundra swan
 Turkey vulture (Cathartes aura)
 Upland sandpiper (Bartramia longicauda)
 Virginia rail
 Western meadowlark (Sturnella neglecta)
 White-fronted goose
 White pelican
 Wild turkey (Meleagris gallopavo)
 Willet (Tringa semipalmata)
 Wilson's phalarope (Phalaropus tricolor)
 Wood duck
 Woodcock
 Yellow rail (Corturnicops noveboracensis)
 Yellow-throated warbler (Dendroica dominica)

Extinct
 Passenger pigeon (Ectopistes migratorius)
 Heath hen (Tympanuchus cupido cupido)
 Carolina parakeet (Conuropsis carolinensis)

Fish
 Alewife (Alosa pseudoharengus)
 American gizzard shad (Dorosoma cepedianum)
 American eel (Anguilla rostrata)
 Atlantic salmon (Salmo salar)
 Black buffalo (Ictiobus Niger)
 Black bullhead (Ameiurus melas)
 Black crappie (Pomoxis nigromaculatus)
 Bluegill (Lepomis macrochirus)
 Bigmouth buffalo (Ictiobus cyprinellus)
 Brook (five-spined) stickleback (Culaea inconstans)
 Brook silverside (Labidesthes sicculus)
 Brook trout (Salvelinus fontinalis)
 Brown bullhead (Ameiurus nebulosus)
 Brown trout (Salmo trutta)
 Bowfin (Amia calve)
 Burbot (Lota lota)
 Channel catfish (Ictalurus punctatus)
 Chinook salmon (Oncorhynchus tshawytscha)
 Coho salmon (Oncorhynchus kisutch)
 Common carp (Cyprinus carpio)
 Dace
 Darter
 Flathead catfish (Pylodictis olivaris)
 Freshwater drum (Aplodinotus grunniens)
 Goldfish (Carassius auratus)
 Grass carp (Ctenopharyngodon idella)
 Grass pickerel (Esox americanus vermiculatus)
 Green sunfish (Lepomis cyanellus)
 Killifish
 Lake herring or northern cisco (Coregonus artedi)
 Lake sturgeon (Acipenser fulvescens)
 Lake trout (Salvelinus namaycush)
 Lake whitefish (Coregonus clupeaformis)
 Largemouth bass (Micropterus salmoides)
 Longear sunfish (Lepomis megalotis)
 Longnose gar (Lepisosteus osseus)
 Longnose sucker (Catostomus catostomus)
 Menominee or round whitefish (Prosopium cylindraceum)
 Mooneye (Hiodon tergisus)
 Muskellunge (Esox masquinongy)
 Ninespine stickleback (Pungitius pungitius)
 Northern hogsucker (Hypentelium nigricans)
 Northern pike (Esox lucius)
 Orangespotted sunfish (Lepomis humilis)
 Oriental weatherfish (Misgurnus anguillicaudatus)
 Pink salmon (Oncorhynchus gorbuscha)
 Pumpkinseed (Lepomis gibbosus)
 Quillback (Carpiodes cyprinus)
 Rainbow darter (Etheostoma caeruleum)
 Rainbow smelt (Osmerus mordax)
 Rainbow trout or steelhead (Oncorhynchus mykiss)
 Redear sunfish (Lepomis microlophus)
 River redhorse (Moxostoma carinatum)
 Rock bass (Ambloplites rupestris)
 Round goby (Neogobius melanostomus)
 Ruffe (Gymnocephalus cernuus)
 Sauger (Sander canadensis)
 Saugeye (Sander canadensis × Sander vitreus)
 Sculpin
 Sea lamprey (Petromyzon marinus)
 Shiner
 Smallmouth bass (Micropterus dolomieu)
 Smallmouth buffalo (Ictiobus bubalus)
 Sockeye or kokanee (Oncorhynchus nerka)
 Splake (Salvelinus namaycush × Salvelinus fontinalis)
 Spotted gar (Lepisosteus oculatus)
 Stonecat (Noturus flavus)
 Threespine stickleback (Gasterosteus aculeatus)
 Topminnow
 Trout-perch (Percopsis omiscomaycus)
 Tubenose goby (Proterorhinus marmoratus)
 Walleye (Sander vitreus)
 Warmouth (Lepomis gulosus)
 Western mosquitofish (Gambusia affinis)
 White bass (Morone chrysops)
 White crappie (Pomoxis annularis)
 White perch (Morone americana)
 White sucker (Catostomus commersonii)
 Yellow bullhead (Ameiurus natalis)
 Yellow perch (Perca flavescens)

Extinct fish
Bigeye chub (Hybopsis amblops)
Bluepike (Sander vitreus glaucus)
Blackfin cisco(Coregonus nigrpinnis)
Deepwater cisco (Coregonus johannae)
Grayling (Thymallus arcticus)
Ironcolor shiner (Notropis chalybaeus)
Mississippi paddlefish (Polyodon spathula)
Shortnose cisco (Coregonus reighardi)
Weed shiner (Notropis texanus)

Mammals

 American badger
 American bison (extirpated)
 American black bear
American ermine
 American marten
 American red squirrel
 American water shrew
 Big brown bat
 Beaver
 Bobcat
 Brown rat (introduced)
 Canada lynx
 Cinereus shrew
 Cougar (extirpated, but vagrants sighted)
 Coyote
 Deer mouse
 Eastern cottontail rabbit
 Eastern gray squirrel
 Eastern mole
 Eastern chipmunk
 Eastern red bat
 Eastern wolf (naturally repopulated)
 Elk (reintroduced)
 Fisher
 Fox squirrel
 Gray fox
 Groundhog
 Hoary bat
 House mouse (introduced)
 Indiana bat
 Least chipmunk
 Least weasel
 Little brown bat
 Long-tailed weasel
 Meadow vole
 Meadow jumping mouse
 Mink
 Moose (reintroduced)
 Muskrat
 North American river otter
 Northern short-tailed shrew
 North American porcupine
 Prairie vole
 Raccoon
 Red fox
 Silver-haired bat
 Snowshoe hare
 Southern bog lemming
 Southern flying squirrel
 Star-nosed mole
 Striped skunk
 Thirteen-lined ground squirrel
 Virginia opossum
 White-footed mouse
 White-tailed deer
 Wolverine (extirpated)
 Woodland caribou (extirpated)
 Woodland jumping mouse
 Woodland vole

Reptiles

References

Identifying Michigan Fish, Michigan Department of Natural Resources
Amphibians and Reptiles, Michigan Department of Natural Resources
Mammals, Michigan Department of Natural Resources
State of Michigan - Crayfish Species Checklist, James W. Fetzner Jr., Section of Invertebrate Zoology, Carnegie Museum of Natural History, Pittsburgh, PA, 28 January 2008